Sicilian orthography uses a variant of the Latin alphabet consisting of 23 or more letters to write the Sicilian language.

History 

Since the emergence of the modern Romance-based Sicilian language in the early 1st millennium, several orthographic systems for writing the language have existed. With the gradual increase in the power of Italian, the Sicilian language had become increasingly decentralised and informal in its orthography. Furthermore, its orthography has taken more elements from Italian orthography, even in places where it is not well suited.

During the period of the Norman Kingdom of Sicily, the Sicilian Latin of the time developed specific elements which reflected local innovations in speech and orthography. Frederick II and his Sicilian School used written Sicilian extensively which is some of the earliest literature and poetry to be produced in an Italo-Romance language. These forms created the basis of the orthographies which evolved substantially over the following thousand years.

After the 15th century Sicilian lost its status as an administrative language. After the decline of administrative written Sicilian began to become limited to the genres of folklore, theatre and poetry. Most examples of orthography we have from these times are in the personal style of various authors, such as Giovanni Meli, who created substantial works in Sicilian. His Poesi siciliani in five volumes was published in 1787, and an edition in six volumes was published in 1814. 

In the late 18th century, publishers began compiling Sicilian language vocabularies. Among others, the Vocabolario siciliano etimologico, italiano e latino (1785, 1795) by Francesco Pasqualino and Michele Pasqualino was particularly influential, especially the 1839 edition with Rosario Rocca's edits and additions.

Inspired by this work, Vincenzo Mortillaro wrote a whole new dictionary intended to capture the language universally spoken across Sicily in a common orthography. He published three editions (1847, 1853 and 1876). And in his dictionary, he also included vocabulary of the sciences, arts and trades.

Later in the century, Antonino Traina (1868) and Vincenzo Nicotra (1883) continued Mortillaro's efforts to develop a common vocabulary and orthography. And in 1875, Giuseppe Pitrè published Grammatica Siciliana, which presents a common grammar, while also providing detailed notes on how the sounds of the Sicilian differ across dialects.

In the 20th century, researchers at the Centro di studi filologici e linguistici siciliani (CSFLS) developed an extensive descriptivist orthography which aims to represent every sound in the natural range of Sicilian accurately. This system has been published in several papers and is also used extensively in the Vocabolario siciliano, by Gaetano Cipolla in his Learn Sicilian series of textbooks and by Arba Sicula in its journal. And because Project Napizia assembled parallel text from Arba Sicula, this is also the system that its machine translator employs.

In 2016 the non-profit Cademia Siciliana began to build on the work of the CSFLS and other researchers to develop a unified orthography which considers etymological, contemporary usage and usability factors.

Alphabet 
There exist several traditional as well as contemporary alphabet proposals. The Sicilian alphabet approximately consists of the following:

See also 
 Vocabolario siciliano
 Sicilian vowel system
 Arba Sicula
 Cadèmia Siciliana

External links 
 Napizia - Dictionary of the Sicilian Language
 Sicilian Translator

References 

Sicilian language
Indo-European Latin-script orthographies